Bananatex is a natural cellulosic biodegradable "technical" canvas fabric made of  Abacá banana plant fibres (also known as Manila hemp). The plants are grown in the Philippines as part of a sustainable forestry project in Catanduanes. Bananatex was developed and is distributed by the Swiss canvas goods company QWSTION and is used in the company's own products as well as in other companies' manufactured goods. Bananatex was developed to have better wear characteristics than cotton while being more sustainable. Although not as durable as synthetics like Cordura, it avoids cordura's limitations of being a plastic and being non-biodegradable. Bananatex is sold in a range of colours and is available  with or without a natural beeswax waterproof coating.

Development 
Bananatex was developed over three years by Zurich, Switzerland-based fashion company QWSTION, which was founded in 2008 to research renewable materials to replace synthetic textiles. The company was created to address environmental, economic and social sustainability issues of petroleum-based synthetic materials in the textile manufacturing industry. Bananatex was created in collaboration with a yarn spinning company in Tainan, Taiwan.

Production process 
Unlike cotton and some other natural fibres like cotton Abacá plants require no pesticides, herbicides or irrigation. This allows mixed-species, organic plantations in areas which were monoculture oil palm plantations, and in deforested rainforest cut down for lumber. Growing abacá plants can reduce erosion, increase biodiversity and enrich the soil. This is accomplished by interplanting abacá with other plant species and by allowing discarded abacá leaves to decompose and return their nutrients to the soil.

Cultivation 
The Abacá plants are grown in Catanduanes in the Philippine highlands without the use of water or pesticides. The banana plant is harvested up to three times per year.

Processing

Dyeing and weaving

Products using Bananatex 
Several companies use Banantex in their products:

 QWSTION: produce a range of bags and laptop sleeves.
 Good News x H&M: London footwear company Good News and H&M have collaborated on a range of sneakers.
 Magazin x Softline: Magazin and Danish furniture company Softline have produced a daybed with a Bananatex cover.
 PALAIUS: produces the MAE Chair, a handmade steel frame chair with Bananatex fabric.

Material properties 
The fibre of Abacá hemp has many different industrial applications due to its extremely high mechanical strength and length of 2 to 3 metres. These mechanical properties make Bananatex strong and durable, while also being soft, lightweight and flexible.

Awards and prizes 

 2020: German Sustainability Award Design 2021 Winner (Category: Pioneers)
 2019: Bundespreis Ecodesign Winner (Category: Product)
 2019: Design Preis Schweiz Winner (Category: Textile Design)
 2019: Green Product Award 2019, Category: Material for Bananatex® by QWSTION
 2019: Cannes Corporate Media and TV Awards 2019, Gold in category: Marketing Communication B2C for Bananatex
 2018: Goldener Hase, Category: Design for Bananatex by QWSTION

External links 

 Bananatex website

References 

Materials
Bananas
Brands by product type